Dion 'Dee' Heslop (born 30 July 2001) is an Australian rules footballer who plays for Brisbane in the AFL Women's competition (AFLW). She has previously played for the Gold Coast.

Early life
Heslop was born in Auckland, New Zealand and moved to the Gold Coast at 10 years of age. She attended Helensvale State High School throughout her upbringing and her first sporting interest was netball where she was a junior state representative for Queensland. She later tried Australian rules football for the Southport Sharks and was identified as a standout by the Gold Coast Suns where she was placed in their developmental academy and subsequently quit netball to pursue a career in the AFLW. She was selected for numerous junior football state representative teams and joined the top level Yeronga Devils in the lead up to her draft year.

AFLW career
Heslop was drafted by the Gold Coast with the 69th pick in the 2019 AFL Women's draft. She made her AFLW debut against Greater Western Sydney in round 1 of the 2020 AFL Women's season. In June 2022, Heslop was delisted by the Gold Coast.

In June 2022, Heslop was drafted by Brisbane with the 57th pick.

Statistics 
Statistics are correct to the end of the 2020 season.

|- style="background-color:#EAEAEA"
! scope="row" style="text-align:center" | 2020
| 
|  25 || 7  || 0  ||  0 ||  27 || 5  || 32  || 4  ||  31 || 0.0 || 0.0  || 3.9 ||  0.7 || 4.6  ||  0.6 || 4.4  || 
|- class="sortbottom"
! colspan=3 | Career
! 7 
!  0
!  0
!  27
!  5
! 32 
! 4
! 31 
! 0.0
! 0.0 
! 3.9 
! 0.7 
! 4.6 
!  0.6
! 4.4
! 
|}

References

External links 

2001 births
Living people
Sportspeople from the Gold Coast, Queensland
Sportswomen from Queensland
Australian rules footballers from Queensland
New Zealand players of Australian rules football
New Zealand emigrants to Australia
Gold Coast Football Club (AFLW) players